The Italian protectorate over Albania was established by the Kingdom of Italy during World War I in an effort to secure a de jure independent Albania under Italian control. It existed from 23 June 1917 until the summer of 1920.

History 

The Kingdom of Italy occupied the port of Vlorë in December 1914, but had to withdraw after the Austrian-Hungarian invasion in late 1915–early 1916, and the fall of Durrës on 27 February 1916. In May 1916, the Italian XVI Corps, some 100,000 men under the command of General Settimio Piacentini, returned and occupied part of southern Albania by the autumn 1916, while the French army occupied Korçë and its surrounding areas on 29 November 1916. The Italian forces (in Gjirokastër) and French forces (in Korçë), according mainly to the development of the Balkans theatre, entered the area of former Autonomous Republic of Northern Epirus (controlled by the Greek minority) in autumn 1916, after approval of the Triple Entente.

The establishment of the Autonomous Albanian Republic of Korçë was done on 10 December 1916, by French authorities with a protocol, according to which an autonomous province would be established on the territories of Korçë, Bilishti, Kolonja, Opar and Gora in eastern Albania.

On 12 December 1916, Italy asked for explanations from the Quai d'Orsay, through its ambassador, because the establishment of the Autonomous Albanian Republic of Korçë violated the Treaty of London. Austria-Hungary used French precedent in Korçë to justify the proclamation of independence of Albania under its protectorate on 3 January 1917, in Shkodra.

The Kingdom of Italy did the same when proclaiming independence of Albania under its protectorate on 23 June 1917, in Gjirokastra. General Giacinto Ferrero proclaimed on that day the Italian Protectorate and the next weeks occupied Ioannina in Epirus. Neither Great Britain nor France had been consulted beforehand, and they did not give any official recognition to the Italian Protectorate.

This Albanian republic under the leadership of Turhan Përmeti, protected by 100,000 soldiers of the Italian Army, adopted officially a red flag with a black eagle in the middle, but raised a storm of protests even in the Italian Parliament.

In autumn 1918, the Italians expanded their Protectorate (without adding anything officially to Albania) to areas of northern Greece (around Kastoria) and western Macedonia (around Bitola), conquered from the Bulgarians and Ottomans. On 25 September the Italian 35 Division reached and occupied Krusevo deep inside western Macedonia.

In October 1918, the Italian XVI Corpo d' Armata (nearly four divisions, with 2 Albanian volunteers battalions) conquered all north-central Albania from the Austrians: on 14 October Durrës, the next day Tirana and on 31 October Scutari; finally on 3 November Ulcinj and Bar in coastal Montenegro were taken.

In November 1918, when World War I finished, nearly all what is now contemporary Albania was under the Italian Protectorate. A Regency government was announced following the end of the war. The French expedition withdrew from Korçë in May 1920, resulting in the area being ceded to the Regency.

Since then and for nearly two years until summer 1920 the Italian Protectorate over Albania was administered by the Italian government: in a country that lacked nearly everything after centuries of Ottoman rule, were built  of new roads,  of new railroads,  of telegraph lines, 9 teleferics, a few hospitals and some modern administrative buildings.

After World War I 

A delegation sent by a postwar Albanian National Assembly that met at Durrës in December 1918 defended Albanian interests at the Paris Peace Conference, but the conference denied Albania official representation. The National Assembly, anxious to keep Albania intact, expressed willingness to accept Italian protection and even an Italian prince as a ruler so long as it would mean Albania did not lose territory.

But in January 1920, at the Paris Peace Conference, negotiators from France, Britain, Italy and Greece agreed to divide Albania among Yugoslavia, Italy, and Greece as a diplomatic expedient aimed at finding a compromise solution to the territorial conflict between Italy and Yugoslavia. The deal gave the Valona territory and areas of south-central Albania to Italy.

This deal created huge anti-Italian resentment between many Albanians and in May 1920 the Italians (even because of demobilisation of their troops after World War I ended) withdrew to some important cities (Durazzo, Scutari, Tirane, Valona, Tepelani and Clisura) and their surrounding areas: subsequently they were forced to fight the Vlora War. The revolutionary movements  in Italy made the presence of the last 20,000 soldiers of the Italian Army in Albania basically impossible.

On August 2, 1920, the Albanian-Italian protocol was signed, upon which Italy retreated from Albania (maintaining only the island of Saseno). This put an end to Italian claims for Vlora and for a mandate over Albania, rescuing the territory of the Albanian state from further partition.

The desire to compensate for this retreat would be one of Benito Mussolini's main motives in invading Albania in 1939.

See also 
 Albania during World War I
 Autonomous Albanian Republic of Korçë
 History of Albania
 Principality of Albania
 Italian invasion of Albania
 Autonomous Republic of Northern Epirus

References

Bibliography 
 Biagini, Antonello. Storia dell'Albania contemporanea. Bompiani editore. Milano, 2005
 Borgogni, Massimo. Tra continuità e incertezza. Italia e Albania (1914-1939). La strategia politico-militare dell'Italia in Albania fino all'Operazione "Oltre Mare Tirana" . 2007 Franco Angeli
 Bucciol, Eugenio. Albania: fronte dimenticato della Grande guerra. Nuova Dimensione Edizioni. Portogruaro, 2001 
 Bushkoff, Leonard. Albania, history of. Collier's Encyclopedia. vol. 1. NY: P.F. Collier, L.P, 1996.
 Nigel, Thomas. Armies in the Balkans 1914-18. Osprey Publishing. Oxford, 2001 
 Pearson, Owens. Albania in the twentieth century: a history (Volume 3). Publisher I.B.Tauris. London, 2004 
 Steiner, Zara. The lights that failed: European international history, 1919-1933. Oxford University Press. Oxford, 2005.
 Stickney, Edith. Southern Albania. Stanford University Press. Stanford, 1929

External links
 Italian Army in Albania in 1916 & 1917
 Italian Army in Albania in 1918

1910s in Italy
1910s in Albania
Albania–Italy relations
Former protectorates
States and territories established in 1917
States and territories disestablished in 1920
Former countries of the interwar period